Yangjae Citizens' Forest is a park located near Yangjae Citizen's Forest Station and the Yangjae Tollgate on the Gyeongbu Expressway, the entrance to Seoul. Built for the 1986 Asian Games and 1988 Seoul Olympics, the land was prepared in July 1983 as part of Gaepo-dong Land Arrangement Plan. The construction of the Forest continued for about three years and completed in November 1986. The park's major facilities include landscaped facilities, such as Grass Field, Octagonal Pavilion, and Pagora (wisteria trellis). The forest also has sports facilities, such as tennis and basketball courts. Other major structures in the Forest include the Memorial Hall for the war hero Yun Bonggil, a parking lot, children's playground, and an outdoor wedding hall. The park also has a number of memorials honouring civilian deaths, including the bombing of Korean Air Flight 858 that killed 115 and the Sampoong Department Store collapse in 1995 that killed 502.

Forest facts
Address: 236 Yangjae 2-dong
Admission: Free
Parking: capacity for 571 cars
The forest is just outside exit 5.

References

Parks in Seoul
Urban forests in South Korea
1980s establishments in South Korea